The Indian in the Cupboard is a 1995 American family fantasy film directed by Frank Oz and written by Melissa Mathison, based on the 1980 children's book of the same name by Lynne Reid Banks. The story revolves around a boy who receives a cupboard as a gift on his ninth birthday. He later discovers that putting toy figures in the cupboard, after locking and unlocking it, brings the toys to life. The film stars Hal Scardino as Omri, Litefoot as Little Bear, Lindsay Crouse, Richard Jenkins, Rishi Bhat as Omri's friend Patrick, Steve Coogan as Tommy Atkins, and David Keith as Boone the Cowboy.

Plot 
On his ninth birthday, Omri receives an old cupboard from his brother and a toy Native American from his best friend Patrick. Omri gets a special key from his mom, which she got from her grandmother, and locks the toy in the cupboard. The next morning, he hears a small tapping noise coming from the cupboard, and finds that the toy has magically come to life. Frightened by Omri's size, the tiny man pulls out a dagger and points it at Omri. Omri closes and locks the cupboard and decides to keep it a secret.

The next day, the living toy eventually reveals himself as an English-speaking, 18th-century Iroquois (specifically Onondaga) man named Little Bear (Litefoot) who was fighting in the French and Indian War on the side of the British. During Little Bear's stay with Omri, Omri learns a lot about the Iroquois, and the two develop a friendship. Omri also learns that Little Bear is a widower.

When Omri brings to life another Native American figure (resembling a Mohawk chieftain), saying Little Bear can have the chieftain's longbow, the chieftain suffers a heart attack out of fear after looking at Omri. Omri's shocked reaction causes Little Bear to realize that Omri really is a child, and not a spirit.

Eventually, Omri reveals his secret to Patrick, who immediately wants to bring to life a toy of his own, which becomes a cowboy from 1879 called "Boohoo" Boone. Boone and Little Bear are initially hostile toward one another, but are forced to behave themselves when Omri and Patrick bring them to school.

That night, Omri and Patrick, along with Little Bear and Boone, watch a program on TV that shows a relentless slaughter of Apaches by cowboys. Boone is enthusiastic at the sight of his "boys" killing the helpless Native Americans, while Little Bear watches in horror at the sight of his people being massacred. Upon hearing Boone fire his gun into the air with delight, Little Bear becomes confused and shoots an arrow into Boone's chest.

The key to the cabinet is lost, and Little Bear goes under the floor to retrieve it, nearly getting killed by an escaped pet rat in the process. With the key back, Omri brings a World War I medic toy to life to treat Boone's wounds. Omri realizes it is time to return Little Bear and Boone to their respective time periods.  Later that night, as Patrick sleeps, Omri goes to bring a female Native American toy to life, but Little Bear realizes what Omri is doing and stops him. Omri says he doesn't want Little Bear to be alone when he goes back, but Little Bear says that the woman probably has people of her own, maybe even her own family. Omri agrees not to bring her to life.

The next morning, Omri and Patrick say their goodbyes to the two tiny men before locking them back in the cupboard and sending them home. Just before saying goodbye, Omri has a vision of a life-sized Little Bear telling him that he takes Omri on as his nephew.

Cast 
 Hal Scardino as Omri
 Litefoot as Little Bear
 David Keith as Boohoo Boone
 Lindsay Crouse as Jane
 Richard Jenkins as Victor
 Rishi Bhat as Patrick
 Lucas Tejwani and Leon Tejwani as Baby Martin
 Steve Coogan as Tommy Atkins
 Sakina Jaffrey as Lucy
 Vincent Kartheiser as Gillon
 Nestor Serrano as Teacher
 Ryan Olson as Adiel
 Michael Papajohn as a Cardassian
 Frank Welker as Special Vocal Effects

Production 
Litefoot was discovered after performing a rap concert in Rome organized by the American Indian College Fund, who recommended him to the producers. When he joined the film, Litefoot convinced the filmmakers to hire an Onondaga adviser, Jeanne Shenandoah, instead of the Mohawk adviser they had, and the adviser helped make his character Little Bear culturally authentic: "From the bottom of my feet to the top of my bald head, all the tattooing, the dropped earlobes, the leggings, the moccasins, were all Onondaga in 1761." Each day of shooting, it took 3 1/2 to 4 1/2 hours to apply his tattoos with permanent markers.

The filming was marred by the death of technician Pat Tanner, who fell while riding a motorized hoist used to lift scenery on the sound stage at Sony Pictures in Culver City. Tanner's death led to a change in motion picture safety rules on IATSE union film sets to prevent similar accidents.

Reception

Critical response
On Rotten Tomatoes, the film holds a score of 71% based on reviews from 24 critics, with an average rating of 6.4/10. The site's consensus states: "The Indian in the Cupboard gussies up its classic source material in modern effects without losing sight of the timeless themes at the heart of the story." On Metacritic, the film has a weighted average score of 58 out of 100, based on 25 critics, indicating "mixed or average reviews". Audiences polled by CinemaScore gave the film an average grade of "A-" on an A+ to F scale.
Kenneth Turan of the Los Angeles Times applauded the film for its themes of trust and cooperation, writing that it "is intent on teaching lessons [...] with a welcome lack of pretension". In a review for The New York Times, Janet Maslin praised Scardino's acting, but felt that the impact of his role was lessened by the film's use of close-ups. She also criticized the minor status of the character of Omri's mother: "Really wasted here is Lindsay Crouse, who [...] never says much more than 'Boys, time for bed.

Roger Ebert of RogerEbert.com reviewed the film negatively, describing it as "not exhilarating or exciting or funny in the ways that E.T. was", and predicted that children would find the story "depressing".

Box office 
The movie debuted at number six at the North American box office.The film made only $35 million against a production budget of $45 million.

See also 
 List of films featuring miniature people
 List of films featuring the Twin Towers

References

External links 

 
  
 
 
 "Animated Indians: Critique and Contradiction in Commodified Children's Culture" by Pauline Turner Strong discusses Pocahontas and The Indian in the Cupboard

1990s American films
1990s English-language films
1990s fantasy drama films
1995 films
1995 drama films
American children's drama films
American children's fantasy films
American fantasy drama films
Columbia Pictures films
Films about children
Films about families
Films about friendship
Films about magic
Films about Native Americans
Films about sentient toys
Films about toys
Films based on British novels
Films based on children's books
Films based on fantasy novels
Films directed by Frank Oz
Films produced by Kathleen Kennedy
Films produced by Frank Marshall
Films scored by Randy Edelman
Films with screenplays by Melissa Mathison
Native American drama films
Paramount Pictures films
The Kennedy/Marshall Company films